is a sailing competitor from Japan. He won a bronze medal at the 2004 Athens Olympics with Kazuto Seki in the 470 (dinghy) class.

Link
2004 Japanese Olympic Committee

1975 births
Living people
Japanese male sailors (sport)
Olympic sailors of Japan
Sailors at the 2004 Summer Olympics – 470
Olympic medalists in sailing
Asian Games medalists in sailing
Sailors at the 2002 Asian Games
Medalists at the 2004 Summer Olympics
Olympic bronze medalists for Japan
Medalists at the 2002 Asian Games
Asian Games silver medalists for Japan